The International Association of Law Enforcement Intelligence Analysts (IALEIA) is an organization incorporated in the United States in 1981. The function of IALEIA is to advance standards of professionalism in law enforcement intelligence analysis at the local, state, national and international levels. IALEIA's aim is to enhance general understanding of the role of intelligence analysis, encourage the recognition of law enforcement intelligence analysis as a professional endeavor, develop International qualification and competency standards, reinforce professional concepts, develop training standards and curricula, supply advisory and related services on intelligence analysis matters, conduct analytic-related research studies and provide the ability to disseminate information regarding analytical techniques and methods.

IALEIA is the largest organization of its kind in the world.  It is a sister organization to the Australian Institute of Professional Intelligence Officers (AIPIO). Its members are eligible for certification by IALEIA's certification arm, formerly known as the Society of Certified Criminal Analysts (SCCA).  It is also closely aligned with the Law Enforcement Intelligence Unit (LEIU), with which IALEIA has held joint annual conferences.

IALEIA teaches a basic law enforcement intelligence analysis course called the Foundations of Intelligence Analysis Training (FIAT).  It has been taught by analysts across North America, Europe, and in the Middle East.  It is a five-day course developed by IALEIA members from their practical experience as analysts and is compliant with the standards in the National Criminal Intelligence Sharing Plan and the Law Enforcement Analytic Standards.  Completion of this, or a similar course, is part of the standards for certification.

IALEIA has also been involved in the publication of several intelligence-related documents.  IALEIA has been a member of the Global Intelligence Working Group (GIWG) since its inception in 2002 and has assisted in the development of standards for analytic training and certification as well.

IALEIA is a non-profit, 501(3)(c) organization with about twenty chapters in North and South America and other countries.  Regular membership is open to those who are intelligence analysts or intelligence officers in law enforcement, the military, national or corporate security.  Associate memberships include those in academia.

IALEIA is run by a volunteer board elected by its membership.  Elections are held every two years. It also has an executive advisory board composed of past intelligence leaders and mentors.

External links
Official website

Law enforcement non-governmental organizations in the United States